Matar Coly (born 10 November 1984) is a Senegalese former professional footballer.

Career
Coly began his career in 1994 in Dakar with Génération Foot, at 10 years old. Aged 18 he joined the youth team of RC Lens, in 2003 was called up to the second team of Lens, where he played alongside Seydou Keita, Daniel Cousin and John Utaka. In the summer of 2005 he transferred to Neuchâtel Xamax, where he played until January 2009 before being sold to Al-Wahda in the United Arab Emirates where he would remain for only six months. Coly returned to Switzerland during the summer of 2009, signing for BSC Young Boys. After featuring for the first-team in his first season with the club, he was moved down to the reserve team for the next two seasons and was finally sent on loan to second-tier side FC Biel-Bienne for the 2012-13 season. In the summer of 2013 Coly signed for FC Lausanne-Sport on a one-year contract with an option for a one-year extension, arriving as a free transfer.

References

External links
 

1984 births
Living people
Senegalese footballers
Association football forwards
Expatriate footballers in France
Expatriate footballers in Switzerland
Expatriate footballers in the United Arab Emirates
RC Lens players
Neuchâtel Xamax FCS players
Al Wahda FC players
BSC Young Boys players
FC Biel-Bienne players
FC Lausanne-Sport players
Swiss Super League players
Swiss Challenge League players
Génération Foot players
UAE Pro League players